Lonnie Hanzon (born September 1, 1959) is a Colorado-based installation artist and television personality, best known for designing the gateway sculpture Evolution of the Ball at Coors Field in Denver, Colorado. His work includes outdoor urban entertainment projects that extend across many acres, and immersive visual merchandising displays.

Career
Hanzon was raised in Pine, Colorado. Immediately after completing high school he performed as a singer, dancer and magician between 1974 and 1981.

A largely self-educated artist, he made his own costumes and sets. He later transitioned into design when other performers such as Paratakeori, Foan Family Circus, the Berg & Prince Mime Company, among others began requesting costumes. He started designing store interiors and window dressings in 1981, and high fashion jewelry in 1982. In 2010 he won first place in the Paper Fashion Show put on by the Art Directors Club of Denver (ADCD).

Lanzon's window dressings garnered local, and then national attention, and led to commissions for increasingly larger and more complex interior and exterior commercial design projects and installations. His Christmas window display 12/25: A Holiday Store in Omaha in 1987 was the first for which retailers were compelled to charge admission to control crowds. He uses a variety of materials including "fabric, steel, glass, sugar, paint, foam, music, water, and electricity".

Hanzon went on to design major public works and commissioned displays throughout the 90s to the present, including installations in Hong Kong where he did the Christmas decorations for a mall that measured . At the time it was the largest such holiday installation in Hong Kong's history. He also did work in Houston, Dallas, Las Vegas, and, most frequently, in Colorado. In addition to his "Evolution of the Ball" display at Coors Field, Hanzon has produced other installations throughout Colorado including at the Red Rocks Community College, Kenneth King Performing Arts Center, Denver Botanic Gardens, and Olde Town Arvada.

Hanzon directed and designed the revitalization and renovation of Denver's downtown holiday scene between 1998 and 2000. He installed displays on the mile-long Pedestrian Mall in historic Larimer Square and Union Station, and around Lower Downtown. He held the title of wizard in residence and creative director at the Museum of Outdoor Arts during which time he designed the Hudson Holiday display at the Hudson Gardens and Events Center in Littleton in 2009 and 2010. Hanzon also rebuilt the annual Parade of Lights in Denver, giving new life to thirteen electrical floats and hundreds of costumed paraders. His projects emphasize storytelling through interactive art and multi-media.

Film and television
Hanzon worked with LucasArts Attractions, a division of LucasFilm, from 1990 to 1991 as Lead Show Producer, where he worked on the re-development concept for 42nd Street and Times Square as well as entertainment projects in Hawaii, Japan, Houston and Hollywood.

Hanzon headlined three HGTV holiday specials, from 2003 to 2005, that featured his work on Neiman Marcus' annual holiday extravaganza. A 2008 window display he designed for a store in Cherry Creek North was featured on a special holiday windows program on HGTV. He also hosted HGTV's Holiday Windows Specials in 2006 and 2009, a program produced by High Noon Entertainment. In 2005, The Food Network aired a special in which Hanzon took the ultimate BBQ Rig Design Challenge.

Select installations and displays
 Lakewood Legacy Trees - Mixed media public sculpture commissioned by Regional Transportation District - Lakewood, Colorado - 2013-2014
 Stone Cloud 4 - Gates Family Foundation – Denver, Colorado - 2013
 Stone Clouds 1,2,&3 Neiman Marcus Art collection – Walnut Creek, California - 2012
 Houston Zoo Lights – Designer - 2012, 2013
 Heist D.C. Nightclub - Interior Vitrine Displays - Washington D.C. - 2012
 Hudson Holiday – produced with Museum of Outdoor Arts and Hudson Gardens. Littleton, Colorado - 2009, 2010
 Puppet Theatre Bench – Monumental bronze sculpture - Commissioned by Museum of Outdoor Arts. Samson Park, Greenwood Village, Colorado - 2009
 Emry Gweldig’s Wondrous Keep – produced with Museum of Outdoor Arts and Cherry Creek North. Denver, Colorado - 2008
 Lannie’s Clocktower Cabaret – interior design - Clocktower Cabaret Inc. Denver, Colorado. - 2006
 Ice + Snow – Holiday light show and performance. Museum of Outdoor Arts.  Samson Park, Greenwood Village, Colorado - 2006
 Lucky Children – Chinese New Year display. The Bellagio Hotel. Las Vegas, Nevada - 2003
 Chandelier Chardin – Monumental glass and LED chandelier and lighting system - Commissioned by John Madden Company.  Palazzo Verdi, Greenwood Village, Colorado - 2008
 Keepers Mandala – Glass doors and side lights installed in the Museum of Outdoor Arts - Commissioned by Museum of Outdoor Arts. Englewood, Colorado - 2007
 Metamorphosis – Architectural sculpture. Dicroic and fused glass - Commissioned by Mazza Galleria. Washington, DC. - 2006
 Eli’s Light – Outdoor memorial to Eli Perlman. Fused glass mosaic - Commissioned by Mizel Center for Arts & Humanities. Denver, Colorado - 2003
 Sculptural Entrance, Fence and Mural - Commissioned by Denver Botanic Gardens. Denver, Colorado - 2001
 Viatica: A collection of over 50 multi media works for the Kenneth King Performing Arts Complex - Commissioned by the Colorado Council of the Arts. Denver, Colorado -  2001.
 Evolution of the Ball – Gateway sculpture at Coors Field. Mixed media - Commissioned by the Downtown Major League Stadium District. Denver, Colorado - 1995

References

External links
 Lonnie Hanzon's website

1959 births
American artists
Artists from Colorado
Living people